Lisa Sauermann (born 25 September 1992) is a mathematician from Germany known for her performance in the International Mathematical Olympiad, where in 2011 she had the single highest (and perfect) score. She won four gold medals (2008–2011) and one silver medal (2007) at the olympiad, representing Germany.

Sauermann attended Martin-Andersen-Nexö-Gymnasium Dresden when she was in 12th grade. She won the Franz Ludwig Gehe Prize in 2011 and the gold medal in the age group III, the 11th–12th grade competition. As a result, she won a trip to the Royal Academy of Sciences in Stockholm. To achieve this, she presented a new mathematical theorem with a proof in a work entitled "Forests with Hypergraphs".

In 2011 she began studying mathematics at the University of Bonn. She became a graduate student studying with Jacob Fox at Stanford University where she obtained her PhD in 2019, receiving two prizes for her dissertation. Currently she works as assistant professor at MIT where she lists her research interests as "extremal and probabilistic combinatorics". In 2022, she was awarded a Sloan fellowship.

Her sister, Anne, two years her junior, was a successful participant in math and science Olympiads at the national level.

Selected publications

References 

1992 births
Living people
21st-century German mathematicians
German women mathematicians
Scientists from Dresden
International Mathematical Olympiad participants
University of Bonn alumni
Stanford University alumni
21st-century women mathematicians
21st-century German women